Étoile Filante de Ouagadougou is a Burkinabé football club based in Ouagadougou. They play their home games at the Stade du 4 Août. The club's colors are blue and white.

Honours
Burkinabé Premier League: 13
 1965, 1985, 1986, 1988, 1990, 1991, 1992, 1993, 1994, 2001, 2008, 2014

Coupe du Faso: 21
1963, 1964, 1965, 1970, 1972, 1975, 1976, 1985, 1988, 1990, 1992, 1993, 1996, 1999, 2000, 2001, 2003, 2006, 2008, 2011, 2017

Burkinabé SuperCup: 6
 1993–94, 1995–96, 1998–99, 2002–03, 2005–06, 2010–11.

Performance in CAF competitions
CAF Champions League: 2 appearances
2002 – First Round
2009 – First Round

African Cup of Champions Clubs: 8 appearances
1966: First Round
1986: First Round
1989: First Round
1991: First Round
1992: First Round
1993: First Round
1994: First Round
1995: First Round

CAF Confederation Cup: 3 appearances
2004 – First Round
2007 – First Round of 16
2012 – First Round

CAF Cup: 3 appearances
1996 – First Round
1999 – Quarter-finals
2003 – First Round

CAF Cup Winners' Cup: 2 appearances
1997 – First Round
2000 – First Round

Current squad

References

External links
 EFO website

 
Football clubs in Burkina Faso
Association football clubs established in 1955
Sport in Ouagadougou
1955 establishments in French Upper Volta